The 2015 Launceston Tennis International was a professional tennis tournament played on outdoor hard courts. It was the first edition (for men) and fourth edition (for women) of the tournament which is part of the 2015 ATP Challenger Tour and the 2015 ITF Women's Circuit, offering a total of $50,000 in prize money for both genders. It took place in Launceston, Tasmania, Australia, on 8–15 February 2015.

Men's singles entrants

Seeds 

 1 Rankings as of 2 February 2015

Other entrants 
The following players received wildcards into the singles main draw:
  Harry Bourchier
  Blake Mott 
  Christopher O'Connell
  Marc Polmans

The following players received entry from the qualifying draw:
  Omar Jasika
  Gavin van Peperzeel
  Yūichi Sugita
  Finn Tearney

Women's singles entrants

Seeds 

 1 Rankings as of 2 February 2015

Other entrants 
The following players received wildcards into the singles main draw:
  Destanee Aiava 
  Alison Bai
  Seone Mendez 
  Viktorija Rajicic

The following players received entry from the qualifying draw:
  Alexa Glatch 
  Nudnida Luangnam 
  Xun Fangying 
  Zhang Yuxuan

Champions

Men's singles 

  Bjorn Fratangelo def.  Chung Hyeon, 4–6, 6–2, 7–5

Women's singles 

  Daria Gavrilova def.  Tereza Mrdeža, 6–1, 6–2

Men's doubles 

  Radu Albot /  Mitchell Krueger def.  Adam Hubble /  Jose Rubin Statham, 3–6, 7–5, [11–9]

Women's doubles 

  Han Xinyun /  Junri Namigata def.  Wang Yafan /  Yang Zhaoxuan, 6–4, 3–6, [10–6]

References

External links 
 2015 Launceston Tennis International at tennis.com.au
 2015 Launceston Tennis International at ITFtennis.com

Launceston Tennis International
Launceston Tennis International
Launceston Tennis International
Launceston Tennis International
February 2015 sports events in Australia